Jiahewanggang Station of Guangzhou Metro, formerly known as Jiahe Station during its planning stages, is an interchange station between Lines 2,  3 and 14, and also the northern terminus of Line 2. It is located underground, just northwest of Lingnan New World Garden in Baiyun District of Guangzhou. It started operation on 25September 2010. On 28 December 2018, Line 14 (Phase 1) opened. Jiahewanggang became the interchange station of Line 2, Line 3 and Line 14.

This station provides cross-platform interchange between Line 2 & Line 3, with Line 2 stopping on the inner platforms and Line 3 stopping on the outer platforms. The Line 14 platforms are located one level below the Line 2 & Line 3 platforms.

Station layout

References

Railway stations in China opened in 2010
Guangzhou Metro stations in Baiyun District